Fun with Charades is an Australian television program which aired on Sundays from late 1956 to early 1958 on Melbourne station HSV-7. The show was originally hosted by Miles Maxwell, a music teacher at Brighton Grammar School. Later episodes were hosted by Danny Webb. The format was near-identical to the American series Pantomime Quiz, which itself saw an Australian version in 1957 on stations ATN-7 and GTV-9. It is not known if Fun with Charades was ever kinescoped.

Gameplay
Two teams of four members compete. One member of the team is told the charade (which could be the title of a book, play, etc.) and without saying anything has to act it out, with his team needing to figure out the answer within 60 seconds.

See also
The following game shows also debuted on station HSV-7 during late 1956:
I've Got a Secret 
Stop the Music
Wedding Day

References

External links

1950s Australian game shows
1956 Australian television series debuts
1958 Australian television series endings
Australian live television series
Australian panel games
Black-and-white Australian television shows
English-language television shows
Seven Network original programming